The men's handball tournament at the 1992 Summer Olympics was contested by twelve teams divided in two groups, with the top two proceeding to the semifinals and the bottom four proceeding to placement matches.

Qualification

Squads

Preliminary round

Group A

Group B

Playoffs

Bracket

Semifinals

Eleventh place game

Ninth place game

Seventh place game

Fifth place game

Bronze medal game

Gold medal game

Rankings and statistics

References

External links
Handball & Olympic Games 1936-2000, International Handball Federation, pp. 30–32
Barcelona 1992: Handball  at marcolympics.org

Men's tournament
Men's events at the 1992 Summer Olympics